Serbian Zone League is the fourth tier of football in the Serbian football league system, consisting of 12 divisions as of the 2019–20 season. The divisions are run by the four regional associations, namely Football Association of Western Serbia (four), Football Association of Eastern Serbia (four), Football Association of Vojvodina (three), and Football Association of Belgrade (one). The winner of each division gets promoted to one of the four Serbian League divisions (Belgrade, Vojvodina, East, and West).

Divisions

Current
Football Association of Belgrade
 Belgrade Zone League (2002–present)
Football Association of Eastern Serbia
 Zone League Centre (2019–present)
 Zone League East (2014–present)
 Zone League South (2014–present)
 Zone League West (2014–present)
Football Association of Vojvodina
 Vojvodina League East (2004–2014, 2016–present)
 Vojvodina League North (2004–2008, 2016–present)
 Vojvodina League South (2004–2008, 2016–present)
Football Association of Western Serbia
 Kolubara-Mačva Zone League (2018–present)
 Podunavlje-Šumadija Zone League (2018–present)
 Šumadija-Raška Zone League (2018–present)
 West Morava Zone League (2018–present)

Defunct
Football Association of Eastern Serbia
 Pomoravlje-Timok Zone League (2007–2014)
 Niš Zone League (2002–2014)
 Pomoravlje Zone League (2002–2007)
 South Morava Zone League (2002–2007)
 Timok Zone League (2002–2007)
Football Association of Vojvodina
 Banat Zone League (2014–2016)
 Bačka Zone League (2014–2016)
 Novi Sad-Syrmia Zone League (2014–2016)
 Vojvodina League West (2004–2014)
 Vojvodina First League (2002–2004)
Football Association of Western Serbia
 Drina Zone League (2009–2018)
 Dunav Zone League (2007–2018)
 Morava Zone League (2007–2018)
 Moravica Zone League (2002–2007)
 Podunavlje Zone League (2002–2007)
 Posavina Zone League (2002–2007)
 Šumadija Zone League (2002–2007)

External links
 Football Association of Serbia
 Football Association of Belgrade
 Football Association of Vojvodina
 Football Association of Eastern Serbia
 Football Association of Western Serbia

 
4
Serbia